Shourya is a 2016 Telugu romantic thriller film directed by  K. Dasaradh and produced by Malkapuram Siva Kumar, under the banner of Suraksh Entertainments. The film stars Manchu Manoj and Regina Cassandra in the lead roles. This marks the second time that Dasaradh and Manoj have worked together, after their first film Sri in 2005. The film was released worldwide on 4 March 2016 to negative reviews and bombed at the box office.

Plot
Shourya and Netra are in love. But, Netra's father and uncle oppose this. So, both decide to elope. Before they leave for the UK, they arrive at Netra's village to spend a night in the village temple. On that night, someone tries to slit Netra's throat and Shourya gets implicated. The police also take the case seriously as Netra's father is an MP. As Shourya was sleeping besides Netra, he is suspected and police takes him to custody and interrogates. He explains how they met, how they fell in love. While taking treatment, she dies at hospital. Shourya is taken to court where he agrees that he killed her, as Netra cheated him by agreeing to marry another guy and also meeting him at multiple times without informing Shourya. He tells a false story and makes police take them to Netra's uncle factory by saying he left the weapon at the factory. Police finds several bodies including Netra's sister & her husband. Netra's uncle accepts he killed them for politics as said by Netra's father. Police arrests them. Krishna Prasad arrives at conclusion that Shourya planned everything and created false stories in such a way that Netra's father and uncle are punished by law. He also guesses that Netra is still alive. Krisha Prasad spares Shourya for doing the right thing. At the end, Shourya and Netra unite and live happily.

Cast
Manchu Manoj as Shourya
Regina Cassandra as Netra
Prakash Raj as CBI officer Krishna Prasad
Nagineedu as Netra's father
Subbaraju as Netra's uncle
Nandu as Netra's fiancée
Sayaji Shinde as Maheswara Rao, Nandu's father
Brahmanandam as sports minister
Banerjee as Police officer
Hema as Minister's wife
Shravan as Shourya's friend

Production
Plans to create the film were announced in May 2015 and Manchu Manoj was attached to the film, then titled "Production No 2". No lead actress was attached to the film at this time and production was expected to begin in the summer of that same year. The film's name was later titled Shourya and actress Regina Cassandra was confirmed as the movie's lead actress. Filming commenced later that year and in November about 75% of the film's shooting was completed. The following month digital posters were released for the film and the film was expected to release in January 2016. This release date was pushed back, as filming continued through January.

On 1 February 2016 the film's music received an audio release and the filming for Shourya was announced to be nearing completion. Shourya's producers had previously released one of the movie's reported five songs, "Tuppa Tuppa", online in December. Music for the film was composed by K Veda.

Manoj stated that the role would be a departure from his typical "rugged" roles and that "For the first time, I am playing an out and out uber cool stylish look in this film."

Dasaradh has stated that the film would be a "thrilling love story" and "concept-oriented".

Soundtrack

Release
Shourya was released on 4 March 2016 in 370 to 400 screens across Telangana and Andhra Pradesh.

Reception
Now Running awarded Shourya with 1.5 stars out of 5, writing "Dasaradh tried to deviate from his usual routine and tried some thing different. But in the process, he missed on working out any emotions that are needed for the audience to connect. Except for the honest attempt, there is nothing commendable in the film. Shourya will end up as one more disappointment for Manoj and Dasaradh".

References

External links

2010s Telugu-language films
Indian romantic thriller films
Films about mass murder
Mass murder in fiction
2010s romantic thriller films